The 1946 Swedish Ice Hockey Championship was the 24th season of the Swedish Ice Hockey Championship, the national championship of Sweden. AIK won the championship.

Tournament

Qualification 
 Leksands IF - Mora IK 4:5
 IK Westmanna - Västerås SK 0:9
 Sörhaga IK - BK Dixhof (W)
 IK Warpen - Sandvikens IF (W)
 Wifsta/Östrands IF - Heffners IF 13:1
 IFK Nyland - Wifsta/Östrands IF 1:6
 IK Sleipner - BK Forward 5:2

First round 
 IFK Tumba - Hammarby IF (W)
 Södertälje SK - IF Olympia 8:1
 BK Dixhof - Forshaga IF (W)
 Sundbybergs IK - Atlas Diesels IF 4:6
 IFK Mariefred - Liljanshofs IF 5:4
 Nacka SK - UoIF Matteuspojkarna 7:0
 Årsta SK - Tranebergs IF 3:9
 Skuru IK - Södertälje IF 4:3
 AIK - Reymersholms IK 10:0
 Surahammars IF - Väästerås SK 2:9
 Åkers IF - Westermalms IF 6:8
 Mora IK - Strömsbro IF 12:5
 Brynäs IF - Sandvikens IF 6:5
 IK Sleipner - Karlbergs BK 1:4
 Wifsta/Östrand - Skellefteå SK (W)

1/8 Finals
 Forshaga IF - AIK 1:7 
 Västerås SK - Skuru IK 14:2 
 IFK Mariefred - Hammarby IF 3:10
 Westermalms IF - Tranebergs IF 2:6  
 Södertälje SK - Nacka SK 3:2
 Wifsta/Östrands IF - Atlas Diesel 7:3  
 IK Göta - Karlbergs BK 4:3
 Brynäs IF - Mora IK 2:4

Quarterfinals 
 AIK - Västerås SK 7:6
 Hammarby IF - Tranebergs IF 5:3  
 Södertälje SK - Wifsta/Östrands IF 14:1
 IK Göta - Mora IK 7:5

Semifinals 
 AIK - Hammarby IF 4:2 n.V.
 Södertälje SK - IK Göta 3:1

Final 
 AIK - Södertälje SK 5:1

External links
 Season on hockeyarchives.info

Cham
Swedish Ice Hockey Championship seasons